"Falling" is the fourteenth single by Ant & Dec and the last to be taken from their final album, The Cult of Ant & Dec. It was released in 1997 and served as their final single until 2002's "We're on the Ball". "Falling" reached number 14 in the UK charts on its initial release.

Track listing

Weekly charts

References

1997 singles
Ant & Dec songs
Pop ballads
1996 songs
Songs written by Steve Mac
Songs written by Wayne Hector
Song recordings produced by Steve Mac
Telstar Records singles
Songs written by Anthony McPartlin
Songs written by Declan Donnelly